Dik Manusch (Romani: See the Person, Se människan translated to Swedish) was a street newspaper published in northern Sweden. First published in early 2015 and focused on the Västerbotten province, the newspaper aimed to help homeless European Union migrants – who are primarily Romani people from the Balkans, especially Romania – to support themselves by providing an alternative to begging on the streets. Distributed for free to the migrants, each newspaper was sold for 50 Swedish krona, the profits going entirely to the seller. A second purpose was to create a debate in Swedish society about the conditions faced by these people.

Preparations for the newspaper began in 2014, on suggestion from Ilile Dumitru, who had seen Situation Sthlm being sold by the homeless of Stockholm. The newspaper was created by the association SAMS, a coalition of several different organizations and churches in Skellefteå. The first issue – numbering 5,000 – was printed by Norran, and featured content created by various writers on a non-profit basis. It was distributed in Skellefteå. The second issue, with 15,000 prints, was likewise printed by Norran and financed by volunteer donations. To support the newspaper an association called the Dik Manusch Vänner (Friends of Dik Manusch in English) was formed.

In the beginning of 2017, the editorial staff came to the conclusion that they no longer got enough content sent in to be able to publish an issue. A few months later it was decided to disband the association and to cease publishing the newspaper.

In November 2018, former Dik Manusch editor Britt-Inger Lundqvist started the online newspaper DIKKO which claims to be a successor publication to Dik Manusch.

See also

 Aluma
 Begging
 Faktum

References
<references>

}}</ref> unused -->

</references>

External links 
 
 Dik Manusch in LIBRIS, the national union catalogue for libraries in Sweden

Street newspapers
Swedish-language newspapers
Defunct newspapers published in Sweden
Publications established in 2015
Publications disestablished in 2017
2015 establishments in Sweden
2017 disestablishments in Sweden